Khyber District is a district in Peshawar Division of Khyber Pakhtunkhwa province in Pakistan. Until 2018, it was an agency of the Federally Administered Tribal Areas; with the merger of FATA with Khyber Pakhtunkhwa, it became a district. It ranges from the Tirah valley down to Peshawar. It borders Nangarhar Province to the west, Orakzai District to the south, Kurram District to south west, Peshawar to the east and Mohmand District to the north.

The major clans in District Khyber are Shinwari, Afridi, Mulagori and Shalmani. 

The majority of Afridis live in Khyber Agency, Dara Adam Khel, Kohat and Peshawar. 

All Afridi clans have their own areas in the Tirah Valley, and most of them extend down into the Khyber Pass over which they have always exercised the right of toll. The Malikdin Khel live in the centre of the Tirah and hold Bagh, the traditional meeting place of Afridi jirgas or assemblies. The Aka Khel are scattered in the hills south of Jamrud. All of this area is included in the Khyber Agency. The Adam Khel live in the hills between Peshawar and Kohat. Their preserve is the Kohat Pass in which several of the most important Afridi gun factories are located.

Clans 
The Afridi Tribe is subclassified into eight sub-tribes listed below.

 Kuki khel
 Qambar Khel
 Zakha Khel
 Kamar Khel
 Malikdin khel
 Aka Khel
 Sepah
 Adam Khel
 shlober 
 aka khel

Administration 
Khyber District is currently subdivided into four tehsils.

 Bara Tehsil
 Jamrud Tehsil
 Landi Kotal Tehsil
 Mula Gori Tehsil

Provincial Assembly

Khyber Pass

Khyber Pass is a major feature of the Khyber Agency. Its narrowest point is at Ali Masjid, where the Battle of Ali Masjid occurred. The Khyber Rifles paramilitary organization originated in the area and took their name from it.

Khyber Pass copy 
A Khyber Pass copy is a homemade firearm characteristic of the Khyber area.

Khyber Pass Railway 
Both the Khyber Mail (passenger train) and the Khyber train safari routes passed through the Khyber Agency via the Khyber Pass. Khyber Pass Railway is a railway line in Pakistan.

Education
Khyber Agency is the most literate of all the tribal areas, with a literacy rate of 34.2%, as of 2007 – quite far ahead of the next highest agency, Kurram, at 26.5%. It is also the only agency where the majority of its men are literate, at 57.2%, which is almost 20% ahead of the next highest agency, Kurram. However, its female literacy rate of 10.1% is second after Kurram's 14.4%.

Demographics

At the time of the 2017 census the district had a population of 1,126,973, of which 504,502 were male and 479,669 female. The rural population was 886,789 (90.10%) while the urban population was 97,457 (9.90%). The literacy rate was 41.97% – the male literacy rate was 65.08% while the female literacy rate was 18.10%. 1,273 people in the district were religious minorities, mainly Christians. Pashto was the predominant language, spoken by 98.83% of the population.

The majority of the tribes in Khyber Agency are Afridis.  However, there are important pockets of Mullagoris, Shilmanis, Bangashs and Shinwaries.

Insurgency
Tehrik-i-Taliban Pakistan, Lashkar-e-Islam and Tehreek-e-Nafaz-e-Shariat-e-Mohammadi militants began entering Khyber Agency after the US-led NATO invasion of Afghanistan in 2001. Due to absence of a strong government and security network in the area and its rough, mountainous terrain, the area became a hotbed of insurgents and over 90 percent of the agency came under their control in 2007. After 2007, the militants began attacking government and military establishments in KPK province, killing many people and wounding many more. The Pakistan Army began an operation in 2008 to clear the agency of militants and restore normal life in the area. The operation continued for years and resulted in the killing of hundreds of TTP militants and Pakistan Army soldiers. The Local Aman Lashkars or peace committees supported the army by fighting the foreign terrorists. By July 2012, a major part of the agency was cleared but military operation continued in Bara Tehsil of the agency. The operation also produced a large number of internally displaced people.
 In October 2014, Pakistan Armed Forces launched a military offensive in Khyber Agency code-named Operation Khyber-1.

Sports

People belonging to this area enjoy cricket. Famous Pakistani cricketer Shahid Afridi and his son-in-law Shaheen Afridi also belong to this area.

See also
Khyber Pass Economic Corridor

References

External links

 Homepage for the Political Agent Khyber Agency
 http://www.khyber.org/places/2005/KhyberAgency.shtml – Khyber Agency information

 
Districts of Khyber Pakhtunkhwa